Centroptilum is a genus of mayflies of the family Baetidae.

Species
 Centroptilum luteolum
 Centroptilum pennulatum

Mayflies
Mayfly genera